Gold Cobra is the fifth studio album by American rap rock band Limp Bizkit. Released in 2011 by Flip and Interscope Records, it is the band's first studio album since 2003's Results May Vary and its first with the full original lineup since 2000's Chocolate Starfish and the Hot Dog Flavored Water. Gold Cobra features an eclectic and diverse sound, but is also similar in style to the band's earlier albums. The album, which featured the single "Shotgun" and received mixed reviews, sold 27,000 copies during its first week in the United States and peaked at No. 16 on the Billboard 200. This was their last album for a decade, until the band released Still Sucks in 2021.

Background 
In 2004, Limp Bizkit recorded The Unquestionable Truth (Part 1), with returning member Wes Borland, but John Otto was replaced by Sammy Siegler for much of the album. Following the release of the band's Greatest Hitz album, the band went on hiatus. Borland stated that it was unlikely that a sequel to The Unquestionable Truth would be produced and that "As of right now, none of my future plans include Limp Bizkit." In 2009, Limp Bizkit reunited with Borland on guitar and launched the Unicorns N' Rainbows Tour.

During the tour Durst announced that they had begun to record a new album with Borland, titled Gold Cobra. Borland said that the title does not have any meaning, and that it was chosen because it fit the style of music the band was writing for the album. The band recorded a spoken intro written by Durst and performed by Kiss member Gene Simmons for the album, but it was left off the completed album. The band also recorded additional "non-album" tracks, including "Combat Jazz", which featured rapper Raekwon.

Music and lyrics
The music of Gold Cobra was generally described as nu metal, and has been noted as a return to the established sound of Limp Bizkit's earlier albums. However, the album features noticeable variations from the band's established style for a more eclectic sound. Unlike Significant Other, Chocolate Starfish and the Hot Dog Flavored Water and Results May Vary, Gold Cobra does not feature any guest vocalists, except for two of the bonus tracks, and the album's sound predominately focuses on the guitar work of Wes Borland rather than that of turntablist and sound designer DJ Lethal. Sam Rivers' bass playing incorporates elements of jazz and funk, while Borland's guitar playing incorporates a variety of influences, ranging from heavy metal and hard rock to electronic music and DJ Lethal's keyboards and samples give the album a sound that is both melodic and abrasive. The intro, "Introbra", features distorted air raid sirens, and is much darker in tone than the hip hop-influenced intros on Significant Other and Chocolate Starfish and the Hot Dog Flavored Water. Interludes on the album incorporate elements of hip hop and jazz.

"Bring It Back" differs from Limp Bizkit's established sound by being slower and heavier than the band is generally known for. "Shark Attack" is an uptempo track which features references to earlier songs, such as the lyric "another one of those days", which refers to the lyrics of "Break Stuff". "Walking Away", "Loser" and the album's first single, "Shotgun", are noted for featuring guitar solos by Borland, something that Limp Bizkit is not known for. "Shotgun", influenced by heavy metal music, has been described as an anthem by Artistdirect. "Walking Away" is a serene, ambient ballad with introspective lyrics which does not contain any hip hop influence or rapping, in contrast to the sound the band is generally known for, and builds with dramatic solos. "Loser" combines the softer sound of "Walking Away" with rapped verses, and is followed by a heavier track, "Autotunage", featuring Durst singing in autotune, and "90.2.10", which incorporates a thrash influence.

Critical reception

At Metacritic, which assigns a normalised rating out of 100 to reviews from mainstream critics, the album has received an average score of 53, indicating "mixed or average reviews", based on 11 reviews. Artistdirect reviewer Rick Florino gave the album 5 out of 5 stars, writing "Gold Cobra is everything you hoped it would be, and rap and metal will be walking funny after it takes a bite out of both them". Allmusic's Stephen Thomas Erlewine gave the album a positive review, calling it "a return to the full-throttled attack of Three Dollar Bill Y'All". Metal Hammer writer Terry Bezer wrote, "Aside from the odd duff moment, Gold Cobra throws out the hot shit that’ll make you bounce in the mosh pit over and over again."

David Buchanan, of Consequence of Sound, called Gold Cobra "an entertaining, boastful, non-alienating piece of nostalgic bliss for those who once held memberships with the LB". In a similar context, Bloody Disgusting writer Jonathan Barkan gave the album a positive review, stating "The album, on a whole, sounds fantastic.  [...] It's not Paganini or Opeth or Dream Theater. It's rap rock and it does exactly what it sets out to do." IGN writer Chad Grischow wrote, "Though far from their best work, Limp Bizkit's latest at least proves that their 2005 Greatest Hitz album may have been premature." About.com writer Tim Grierson called Gold Cobra "the group’s strongest since Significant Other".

Entertainment Weekly reviewer Kyle Anderson called the album an "oft-delayed, petulant, and hook-devoid 'comeback' from the onetime champions of early-aughts nü-metal mania. Antiquiet published a negative review which described the album as "music for the sneering scumbags who find kinship in the dregs of cultural rot". The website initially gave the album 1 out of 5 stars. Wes Borland responded to the review, stating "The hatred you have for Fred is part of the reason we've succeeded. [...] No matter what effect he has on people in a ‘TMZ Personality’ kind of way, he is an astonishing front man and performer. I could see 1 out of 5 if you were expecting OK Computer [...] As far as LB records go, Gold Cobra is perfect."

Commercial performance
Gold Cobra charted at No. 16 on the Billboard 200 charts with 27,000 copies sold in the first week in the United States. The album charted on Billboard Albums for the No. 3 Rock Album, No. 11 Digital Album, No. 2 Alternative Album, No. 1 Hard Rock Album and No. 21 Tastemakers Album.  In its second week of release overseas Gold Cobra was No. 7 on the Swiss Album Charts, No. 8 on the Austrian Album Charts, No. 24 on the Canadian Albums Chart and No. 1 on the German Albums Chart.

Track listing

Personnel

Limp Bizkit
 Wes Borland – guitars
 Fred Durst – vocals
 DJ Lethal – turntables, keyboards, samples, programming
 John Otto – drums
 Sam Rivers – bass

Production
 Todd Douglas – business affairs
 Cory Durst – photography
 Cliff Feiman – production supervisor
 Brian Frank – marketing
 Susan Hilderley – business affairs
 Alex Rhees – marketing
 Dave Schiffman – mixing, recording
 Jordan Schur – management
 Liam Ward – layout
 Howie Weinberg – mastering
 Boney B.eats – additional production on "Back Porch"
 Hayes – additional production on "Shotgun"
 Wes Borland – cover art design, art direction, illustration
 Fred Durst – producer, management, art direction

Charts

Weekly charts

Year-end charts

Certifications and sales

Release history

References

Limp Bizkit albums
Flip Records (1994) albums
2011 albums